16593 / 94 Hazur Sahib Nanded Bangalore City Express is an Express train belonging to Indian Railways South Western Railway zone that runs between  and  in India.

Background
This train was introduced in 1993 as Bidar Link Express, It was the only one train connecting Bangalore and Bidar at that time. It was extended to Nanded after few months since Nanded lacked a direct train to Bangalore. In 1996, this train was attached to this train as the Hampi Express which connects between Hubli and Mysore later it became a separate train in 2010.

Service 
It operates as train number 16594 from Hazur Sahib Nanded to Bangalore City and as train number 16593 in the reverse direction, serving the states of Maharashtra, Andhra Pradesh, Telangana & Karnataka.

Coaches

The 16593 / 94 Hazur Sahib Nanded–Bangalore City  Express has one First AC, three AC 3-tier, nine sleeper class, four general unreserved & two SLR (seating with luggage rake) coaches. It doesn't carry a pantry car.

As with most train services in India, coach composition may be amended at the discretion of Indian Railways depending on demand.

Routing

Traction
As this route is partially electrified, a Lallaguda-based electric WAP-7 pulls the train from Bangalore to Vikarabad and a Guntakal-based diesel WDM-3D pulls towards its destination.

References

External links
16593 Hazur Sahib Nanded Bangalore City Express at India Rail Info
16594 Bangalore City Hazur Sahib Nanded Express at India Rail Info

Express trains in India
Rail transport in Maharashtra
Rail transport in Andhra Pradesh
Rail transport in Telangana
Rail transport in Karnataka
Transport in Nanded
Transport in Bangalore